Denim is a sturdy cotton warp-faced textile in which the weft passes under two or more warp threads. This twill weaving produces a diagonal ribbing that distinguishes it from cotton duck. While a denim predecessor known as dungaree has been produced in India for hundreds of years, denim as it is recognized today was first produced in Nîmes, France.

Denim is available in a range of colors, but the most common denim is indigo denim in which the warp thread is dyed while the weft thread is left white. As a result of the warp-faced twill weaving, one side of the textile is dominated by the blue warp threads and the other side is dominated by the white weft threads. Jeans fabricated from this cloth are thus predominantly white on the inside. Denim is used to create a wide variety of garments, accessories, and furniture.

Etymology
'Denim' originated as a contraction of the French phrase  ('serge from Nîmes').

History
Denim has been used in the United States since the mid-19th century. Denim initially gained popularity in 1873 when Jacob W. Davis, a tailor from Nevada, manufactured the first pair of rivet-reinforced denim pants. The popularity of denim jeans outstripped the capacity of Davis's small shop, so he moved his production to the facilities of dry goods wholesaler Levi Strauss & Co., which had been supplying Davis with bolts of denim fabric.

Throughout the 20th century denim was used for cheap durable uniforms like those issued to staff of the French national railways. In the postwar years, Royal Air Force overalls for dirty work were named "denims". These were a one-piece garment, with long legs and sleeves, buttoned from throat to crotch, in an olive drab denim fabric.

Creating denim
All denim is created through generally the same process:

Denim is a type of woven twill fabric, usually made from cotton. It consists of two yarns that are woven together. The yarn that runs across known as the weft is threaded over and under the yarn that runs downwards, which is called the warp.

 Cotton fiber is spun into yarn
 The warp yarn is dyed, while the weft is left white (usually)  
 The yarns are woven on a shuttle loom or projectile loom
 The woven product is sanforized

Yarn production
Most denim yarn is composed entirely of cotton, a natural fiber cultivated since prehistoric times, and domesticated independently in the Old World (Africa, Europe and Asia) and New World (the Western Hemisphere).

Once cotton fibers are cleaned and combed into long, cohesive lengths of similar-length fiber, they are spun into yarn using an industrial machine. Throughout the creation of denim, washes, dyes, or treatments are used to change the appearance of denim products.

Some denim yarn may use an  elastic component such as spandex for up to 3% of the content to allow the final woven product to stretch. Even such a small amount of spandex enables a stretching capacity of about 15%.

Dyeing
Denim was originally dyed with indigo dye extracted from plants, often from the genus Indigofera. In South Asia, indigo dye was extracted from the dried and fermented leaves of Indigofera tinctoria; this is the plant that is now known as "true indigo" or "natural indigo". In Europe, use of Isatis tinctoria, or woad, can be traced back to the 8th century BC, although it was eventually replaced by Indigofera tinctoria as the superior dye product. However, most denim today is dyed with synthetic indigo dye. In all cases, the yarn undergoes a repeated sequence of dipping and oxidation—the more dips, the stronger the color of the indigo.

Prior to 1915, cotton yarns were dyed using a skein dyeing process, in which individual skeins of yarn were dipped into dye baths. Rope dyeing machines were developed in 1915, and slasher or sheet dyeing machines were developed in the 1970s; both of these methods involve a series of rollers that feed continuous yarns in and out of dye vats. In rope dyeing, continuous yarns are gathered together into long ropes or groups of yarns – after these bundles are dyed, they must be re-beamed for weaving. In sheet dyeing, parallel yarns are laid out as a sheet, in the same order in which they will be woven; because of this, uneven circulation of dye in the dye bath can lead to side-to-side color variations in the woven cloth. Rope dyeing eliminates this possibility, because color variations can be evenly distributed across the warp during beaming.

Denim fabric dyeing is divided into two categories: indigo dyeing (Indigo dye is unique shade of blue) and sulfur dyeing(Sulfur dye is a synthetic organic dye and it is formed by sulphurisation of organic intermediates, this contains nitro or amino groups). Indigo dyeing produces the traditional blue color or shades similar to it. Sulfur dyeing produces specialty black colors and other colors, such as red, pink, purple, grey, rust, mustard, and green.

Weaving

Shuttle-loom-woven denim is typically recognizable by its selvedge (or selvage), the edge of a fabric created as a continuous cross-yarn (the weft) reverses direction at the edge side of the shuttle loom. The selvedge is traditionally accentuated with warp threads of one or more contrasting colors, which can serve as an identifying mark.

Although quality denim can be made on either loom, selvedge denim has come to be associated with premium products since final production that showcases the selvedge requires greater care of assemblage.

Post-production treatment
Particularly with denim jeans, a significant amount of the aesthetic treatment of denim occurs after the denim has been cut and sewn into the final garment.

Many denim articles are washed to make them softer and to reduce or minimize shrinkage even beyond what sanforization prevents. Significantly washed denim can resemble dry denim which has faded naturally over extended use. Such distressing may be supplemented by chemical treatments or physical techniques such as stone washing.

Changes in appearance due to use

Over time dry denim will fade, which is considered fashionable in some circumstances. During the process of wear, fading will usually occur on those parts of the article that receive the most stress. On a pair of jeans, this includes the upper thighs, the ankles, and the areas behind the knees.

To facilitate the natural distressing process, some wearers of dry denim will abstain from washing their jeans for more than six months. Most dry denim is made with 100% cotton and comes from several different countries.

Patterns of fading in jeans caused by prolonged periods of wearing them without washing are a way of "personalizing" the garment. Such patterns include:
 honeycombs – meshes of faded line-segments that form behind the knees
 whiskers – faded streaks that form radially from the crotch area
 stacks – irregular bands of fading above the ankle caused by accordioning of the fabric due to contact with the foot or shoe
 train tracks – fading along the out-seams due to abrasion

Uses

Clothing

 Aprons
 Boots and athletic shoes
 Capri pants
 Cloth face mask
 Dresses
 Hats
 Jackets
 Jeans
 Jeggings
 Overalls
 Shirts
 Shorts, including Daisy Dukes  and cut-offs
 Skirts
 Sneakers (Keds, Converse Chuck Taylor All-Stars)
 Suits

Accessories

Belts
Handbags (purses)
Tote bags
Wallets

Furniture

 Bean bag chairs
 Lampshades
 Upholstery

Vehicles

As jeans grew in popularity in the early 1970s, "one of the most creative carmakers of the era, AMC, took note." Starting with the 1973 model year, American Motors (AMC) offered a regular production option consisting of a Levi's interior trim package. American Motors had an objective of offering fashion interiors for its cars and the Levi's trim was "designed to appeal to young men and women who enjoy the casual look in clothes and cars". Over the years it was available on the Gremlin, Hornet, and Pacer.

Although the car's jean material looks just like the real thing, AMC used spun nylon that was made to imitate denim. This was because real denim fabric is not tough enough for automobile use and cannot pass fire resistance safety standards. The copper rivets were the actual versions and the seat design included traditional contrasting stitching with the Levi's tab on both the front seat backs. The option also included unique door panels with Levis trim and removable map pockets, as well as "Levi's" decal identification on the front fenders. The Levi's trim package option was $134.95, but only $49.95 extra if ordered together with the "Gremlin X" appearance option. The Levi's interior upholstery was available through the 1978 model year AMC Gremlin. It has become one of the best-known options on the Gremlins.

A Levi's trim package was also available by AMC on most Jeeps, including the CJ series, the full-size Cherokee (SJ), and the J series pickup trucks from 1975 through 1977. This consisted of denim-colored-and-textured vinyl upholstery and a matching canvas top. This option was available on all CJ models in blue or tan, and was the standard trim on the top-level Renegade versions. The Levi's association was removed in later years with the upholstery trim named "Denim vinyl" through 1980.

Between 1973 and 1975 Volkswagen produced the Jeans Beetle, which had denim interior trim and special exterior graphics for sale in Europe. This concept was repeated in some later models.

Art 

British artist Ian Berry has been making art with only denim for well over a decade. and is famed around the world for his photorealistic pieces all hand cut out of only denim of portraits and scenes. He has made pieces of Ayrton Senna, Giorgio Armani, Lapo Elkann, Debbie Harry, Jenifer Saunders, Eunice Olumbide OBE among others. In 2013, he was named as one of the top 30 Artists under 30 in the World by Art Business News.

Worldwide market

In 2020, the worldwide denim market equalled US$57.3 billion, with demand growing by 5.8% and supply growing by 8% annually. Over 50% of denim is produced in Asia, most of it in China, India, Turkey, Pakistan, and Bangladesh.

Globally, the denim industry is expected to grow at a CAGR of over 4.8% during 2022 to 2026, with the market value expected to increase from $57.3 billion to $76.1 billion.

The following table shows where the world's denim mills are located.

See also

Bell-bottoms
Chambray
Denim Day
Denim skirt 
Denimu
Designer jeans
Droptima
Dungaree
Gabardine
Hip-huggers
Jeans
Jeans shorts
Jeggings
Lee National Denim Day
Loon pants
Mom jeans
Overalls
Phat pants
Slim-fit pants
Stone washing
Western fashion
Wide-leg jeans

References

External links

 Riveted: The History of Jeans at PBS's American Experience

Cotton
Jeans
Woven fabrics
Symbols of California